Tweed Farms in Niagara-on-the-Lake, Ontario was the world's largest legal cannabis greenhouse in 2014. At that time, it had  of indoor space. It is owned by Canopy Growth Corporation, a publicly traded Canadian company.

In November 2021, Canopy Growth Corporation shut down Tweed Farms as the company struggled with profitability. As a result of the closure, 30 staff were laid off and 60 staff would be relocated to other indoor facilities in Kincardine, Ontario and Smiths Falls, Ontario.

See also
Delta 3 greenhouse, British Columbia: Canada's largest cannabis greenhouse

References

External links

Buildings and structures in Niagara-on-the-Lake
Cannabis greenhouses
Greenhouses in Canada
Cannabis in Ontario
Cannabis companies of Canada